This is a list of dictatorial regimes operational in European states in the interwar period, the period between the First World War and the Second World War.

Table summary

See also
 Interwar period
 Dictatorship

Footnotes

Further reading

 Gerhard Besier, Katarzyna Stokłosa, European Dictatorships: A Comparative History of the Twentieth Century, Cambridge 2014, ISBN 9781443855211
 Carles Boix, Michael K. Miller, Sebastian Rosato, A Complete Dataset of Political Regimes, 1800-2007, [in:] Comparative Political Studies 46/12 (2013), pp. 1523-1554
 Stephen J. Lee, European Dictatorships, 1918-1945, London 2002, ISBN 9780415230452
 Monty G. Marshall,Ted Gurr, Keith Jaggers, The Polity IV Project: Political Regime Characteristics and Transitions, 1800-2012 – Dataset Users’ Manual, s.l. 2017, available  here
 Jørgen Møller, Svend-Erik Skaaning, Mapping Political Regime Developments in Interwar Europe: A Multidimensional Approach [paper delivered at ECPR session], Salamanca 2014

External links

 European dictatorships at Britannica service

1910s in Europe
1920s in Europe
1930s in Europe
 
Oligarchy
Authoritarianism
Former countries of the interwar period